This is a list of notable events in country music that took place in the year 1952.

Events 
 July 14 — The Eddy Arnold Show, a brief summer replacement series, debuts on CBS-TV.
 August 23 — Kitty Wells becomes the first female solo artist to score a No. 1 hit on the Billboard country charts with "It Wasn't God Who Made Honky Tonk Angels." The song, an answer to Hank Thompson's "The Wild Side of Life," spends two weeks atop the chart and forever changes how women were seen, both in song and professionally.
 November 22 — Nashville's first Disc Jockey Convention takes place.

No dates
 The life of Hank Williams continues its downward spiral. Even though he enjoys several major hits, his drug and alcohol problems ruin his marriage to Audrey (the divorce was finalized on May 29), and in October, he is fired from the Grand Ole Opry. Williams marries Billie Jean Jones Eshliman in October in New Orleans, Louisiana, and rejoins Louisiana Hayride about that same time. Also during the year, he makes what turn out to be his final recordings.

Top Hits Of 1952

United States
(as certified by Billboard)

Notes
1^ No. 1 song of the year, as determined by Billboard.
2^ Song dropped from No. 1 and later returned to top spot.
A^ First Billboard No. 1 hit for that artist.
B^ Only Billboard No. 1 hit for that artist.

Other major hits

Top new album releases

Births 
 January 12 — Ricky Van Shelton, honky tonk-styled vocalist of the mid-to-late 1980s and early 1990s.
 January 22 — Teddy Gentry, member of Alabama.
 February 18 — Juice Newton, pop-styled country vocalist of the 1980s.
 February 29 — Billy Joe Walker Jr., American musician, record producer, and songwriter (d. 2017).
 May 10 — Kikki Danielsson, Swedish female country singer.
 May 18 — George Strait, country giant since the early 1980s, who helped revitalize the genre.
 July 31 — K.W. Turnbow, drummer of the Western Underground.
 October 11 — Paulette Carlson, female lead vocalist with the band Highway 101 during the peak of its success in the 1980s.
 October 13 — Mundo Earwood, country singer of the 1970s and 1980s. (d. 2014)
 October 19  — Charlie Chase, radio and television personality, one half of Crook & Chase.
 October 24  — Mark Gray, one-time member of Exile who became a solo star in the mid-1980s. (d. 2016)

Deaths 
 March 22 — Uncle Dave Macon, 81, country music pioneer; comedian and banjo player; the first major star of the Grand Ole Opry.
 May 4 – J.L. "Joe" Frank, 52, music executive.
 December 4 – Rabon Delmore, 36, one half of the old-time harmony duo Delmore Brothers.

Further reading 
 Kingsbury, Paul, "Vinyl Hayride: Country Music Album Covers 1947–1989," Country Music Foundation, 2003
 Millard, Bob, "Country Music: 70 Years of America's Favorite Music," HarperCollins, New York, 1993
 Whitburn, Joel. "Top Country Songs 1944–2005 – 6th Edition." 2005.

References 

Country
Country music by year